Major James Brooks Jones (born July 9, 1953) is an American retired professional basketball player who played in the NBA and other leagues. Born in McGehee, Arkansas, he attended and played college basketball at Albany State University.

He was drafted by the American Basketball Association (ABA) in 1974 by the San Diego Conquistadors, and in 1976 by the National Basketball Association's Portland Trail Blazers.

Jones' brothers Wil (born 1947), Caldwell (born 1950) and Charles (born 1957) all played at Albany State and in the NBA.

External links
NBA statistics @ BasketballReference.com

1953 births
Living people
African-American basketball players
Albany State Golden Rams men's basketball players
Allentown Jets players
American men's basketball players
Basketball players from Arkansas
Detroit Pistons players
Houston Rockets players
Parade High School All-Americans (boys' basketball)
People from McGehee, Arkansas
Portland Trail Blazers draft picks
Power forwards (basketball)
San Diego Conquistadors draft picks
Small forwards
Western Basketball Association players
21st-century African-American people
20th-century African-American sportspeople